Janusz Leon Wiśniewski (born 18 August 1954 in Toruń)  is a Polish scientist and writer mostly known for his novel S@motność w Sieci translated into English as Loneliness on the Net. 

Wiśniewski holds a Master in Physics and  Master in Economics, both qualifications obtained from Nicolaus Copernicus University in Toruń, PhD in Information Technology from Warsaw University of Technology and Habilitation in Chemistry from the Technical University of Łódź. He is one of the authors of the computer program AutoNom, a naming tool for organic substances in the IUPAC nomenclature . Currently Wiśniewski lives and works in Frankfurt, Germany. Apart from his native Polish, he is also fluent in German, English and Russian.

His most famous novel S@motność w Sieci (Loneliness on the Net) was published in 2001 and translated into many languages. There is a popular Polish film based on the novel.

Works
 2014, "'Grand'", (Wydawnictwo Wielka Litera), 
 2012, Na fejsie z moim synem (Wydawinctwo Wielka Litera) 
 2011, Ukrwienia (WL, Wydawnictwo Literackie) 
 2011, Łóżko (Świat Książki, Wydawnictwo ) 
 2011, Zbliżenia (WL, Wydawnictwo Literackie )  
 2008, Arytmia uczuć (with Dorota Wellman, Wydawnictwo G +J) 
 2008, W poszukiwaniu Najważniejszego. Bajka trochę naukowa ( Nasza Księgarnia, Wydawnictwo Sp. z o.o. )  
 2007, Czy mężczyźni są światu potrzebni? (Wydawnictwo Literackie) 
 2006, Molekuły emocji (Wydawnictwo Literackie) 
 2006, Opowiadania letnie, a nawet gorące  Wydawnictwo Prószyński i S-ka SA 
 2005, 188 dni i nocy (with Małgorzata Domagalik, Wydawnictwo Santorski & Co) 
 2005, Opowieści wigilijne  Wydawnictwo Prószyński i S-ka SA 
 2005, Intymna teoria względności (Wydawnictwo Literackie) 
 2005, 10 x miłość  Świat Książki 
 2004, Los powtórzony Wydawnictwo Prószyński i S-ka SA 
 2003, S@motność w sieci. Tryptyk Wydawnictwa Czarne i Prószyński S-ka) 
 2003, Martyna (jako współautor, Wydawnictwo Platforma Mediowa Point Group) 
 2002, Zespoły napięć (Wydawnictwo Prószyński i S-ka SA) 
 2001, S@motność w sieci (Wydawnictwa Czarne i Prószyński S-ka)

References

External links

 Official website of Wiśniewski 

Polish male writers
Polish chemists
1954 births
Nicolaus Copernicus University in Toruń alumni
Living people
Polish expatriates in Germany